The following species have been collected from the Dark Cave, Batu Caves, Selangor in Malaysia:
 Pheretima indica (Haplotaxida: Megascolecidae)
 Dichogaster sp. (Haplotaxida: Octochaetidae)
 Dichogaster bolavi (Haplotaxida: Octochaetidae)
 Sarax brachydactylus (Amblypygi: Tarantulidae)
 Damarchus cavernicolus (Araneae: Ctenizidae)
 Heteropoda robusta (Araneae: Heteropodidae)
 Liphistius batuensis (Araneae: Liphistiidae)
 Psiloderces crinitus (Araneae: Ochyroceratidae)
 Spermophora miser (Araneae: Pholcidae)
 Psechrus curvipalpus (Araneae: Psechridae)
 Scytodes magnus (Araneae: Scytodidae)
 Theriheridion rufipes (Araneae: Theridiidae)
 Uloborus spelaeus (Araneae: Uloboridae)
 Paracheyletia sp. (Eleutherengona: Cheyletidae)
 Ornithodorus bauensis (Ixodida: Argasidae)
 Belba sp. (Oribatida: Belbidae)
 Galumna sp. (Oribatida: Galumnidae)
 Vaghia sp. (Oribatida: Galumnidae)
 Scheloribates exuvium (Oribatida: Oribatulidae)
 Scheloribates sp. (Oribatida: Oribatulidae)
 Trombicula batui (Parasitengona: Trombiculidae)
 Trombicula insolli (Parasitengona: Trombiculidae)
 Cryptocheiridium lucifugum (Pseudoscorpionida: Ideoroncidae)
 Dhanus sumatranus (Pseudoscorpionida: Ideoroncidae)
 Dhanus doveri (Pseudoscorpionida: Ideoroncidae)
 Cunaxa setirostris (Trombidiformes: Cunaxidae)
 Scutigera decipiens (Scutigeromorpha: Cambalidae)
 Glyphiulus sp. (Sphaerotheriida: Cambalidae)
 Doratodesmus sp. (Sphaerotheriida: Cambalidae)
 Brachystomella contorta (Collembola: Brachystomellidae)
 Cunaxa spp. (Collembola: Cunaxidae)
 Willemia nadchatrami (Collembola: Neogastruridae)
 Aderus mcclurei (Coleoptera: Aderidae)
 Euglenes batuensis (Coleoptera: Aderidae)
 Euglenes cephalicus (Coleoptera: Aderidae)
 Euglenes malayanus (Coleoptera: Aderidae)
 Euglenes troglodytes (Coleoptera: Aderidae)
 Unidentified (Coleoptera: Carabidae)
 Unidentified (Coleoptera: Curculionidae)
 Aethriostoma undulata (Coleoptera: Dermestidae)
 Trinodes sp. (Coleoptera: Dermestidae)
 Cardiophorus carduelis (Coleoptera: Elateridae)
 Melanoxanthus near dohrni (Coleoptera: Elateridae)
 Platynuchus sp. (Coleoptera: Elateridae)
 Unidentified (Coleoptera: Endomychidae)
 Platycladoxena near angulosa (Coleoptera: Erotylidae)
 Thallisellodes limbooliati (Coleoptera: Erotylidae)
 Cercyon gebieni (Coleoptera: Hydrophilidae)
 Dactylosternum abdominale (Coleoptera: Hydrophilidae)
 Lychnocrepis antricola (Coleoptera: Lampyridae)
 Unidentified (Coleoptera: Melyridae)
 Unidentified (Coleoptera: Nitidulidae)
 Unidentified (Coleoptera: Orthoperidae)
 Unidentified (Coleoptera: Pselaphidae)
 Trox costatus (Coleoptera: Scarabaeidae)
 Unidentified (Coleoptera: Scydmaenidae)
 Unidentified (Coleoptera: Silphidae)
 Unidentified (Coleoptera: Staphylinidae)
 Coeloecetes cavernicola (Coleoptera: Tenebrionidae)
 Chelisoches morio (Dermaptera: Forficulidae)
 Chelisoches brevipennis (Dermaptera: Forficulidae)
 Unidentified (Diptera: Cecidomyidae)
 Atrichopogon jacobsoni (Diptera: Ceratopogonidae)
 Culicoides huffi (Diptera: Ceratopogonidae)
 Culicoides peregrinus (Diptera: Ceratopogonidae)
 Culicoides prob. arakawai (Diptera: Ceratopogonidae)
 Forcipomyia spp. (Diptera: Ceratopogonidae)
 Stilobezzia sp. (Diptera: Ceratopogonidae)
 Eusmittia cavernae (Diptera: Chironomidae)
 Paratendipes inarmatus (Diptera: Chironomidae)
 Pentaneura batuensis (Diptera: Chironomidae)
 Podonomus sp. (Diptera: Chironomidae)
 Tricimba batucola (Diptera: Chloropidae)
 Chyromya prob. dubia (Diptera: Chyromyidae)
 Gymnochiromyia sp. (Diptera: Chyromyidae)
 Aedes albopictus (Diptera: Culicidae)
 Culex tritaeniorhynchus (Diptera: Culicidae)
 Uranotaenia sp. (Diptera: Culicidae)
 Condylostylus sp. (Diptera: Dolichopodidae)
 Drosophila ananassae (Diptera: Drosophilidae)
 Drosophila melanogaster (Diptera: Drosophilidae)
 Desmometopa spp. (Diptera: Milichiidae)
 Leptometopa mcclurei (Diptera: Milichiidae)
 Milichia sp. (Diptera: Milichiidae)
 Phyllomyza cavernae (Diptera: Milichiidae)
 Fannia leucosticta (Diptera: Muscidae)
 Ophyra chalcogaster (Diptera: Muscidae)
 Chetoneura cavernae (Diptera: Mycetophilidae)
 Eucampsipoda sundaicum (Diptera: Nycteribiidae)
 Nycteribosca prob. gigantea (Diptera: Nycteribiidae)
 Diploneura peregrina (Diptera: Phoridae)
 Brunettia sp. (Diptera: Psychodidae)
 Phlebotomus anodontis (Diptera: Psychodidae)
 Phlebotomus anondontis (Diptera: Psychodidae)
 Phlebotomus argentipes (Diptera: Psychodidae)
 Phlebotomus asperules (Diptera: Psychodidae)
 Phlebotomus lutea (Diptera: Psychodidae)
 Phlebotomus makati (Diptera: Psychodidae)
 Phlebotomus malayica (Diptera: Psychodidae)
 Phlebotomus savaiiensis (Diptera: Psychodidae)
 Phlebotomus stantion (Diptera: Psychodidae)
 Psychoda acanthostyla (Diptera: Psychodidae)
 Psychoda alternata (Diptera: Psychodidae)
 Psychoda aponesos (Diptera: Psychodidae)
 Psychoda harrisi (Diptera: Psychodidae)
 Psychoda malleola (Diptera: Psychodidae)
 Psychoda pellucida (Diptera: Psychodidae)
 Psychoda vagabunda (Diptera: Psychodidae)
 Sycorax malayensis (Diptera: Psychodidae)
 Telmatoscopus albipuntatus (Diptera: Psychodidae)
 Telmatoscopus kulas (Diptera: Psychodidae)
 Telmatoscopus mcclurei (Diptera: Psychodidae)
 Trichomyia batu (Diptera: Psychodidae)
 Trichomyia malaya (Diptera: Psychodidae)
 Unidentified (Diptera: Sarcophagidae)
 Bradysia flagellicornis (Diptera: Sciaridae)
 Bradysia leucocerca (Diptera: Sciaridae)
 Bradysia platytergum (Diptera: Sciaridae)
 Bradysia spp. (Diptera: Sciaridae)
 Bradysia leucocerca (Diptera: Sciaridae)
 Phorodonta malayana (Diptera: Sciaridae)
 Plastosciara near brevicalcarata (Diptera: Sciaridae)
 Soudekia sp. (Diptera: Sciaridae)
 Leptocera brevicostata (Diptera: Sphaeroceridae)
 Sargus metallinus (Diptera: Stratiomyidae)
 Helius cavernicolus (Diptera: Tipulidae)
 Cleon sp. (Ephemeroptera: Ephemeridae)
 Myiophanes fluitaria (Hemiptera: Reduviidae)
 Unidentified (Hemiptera: Cydnidae)
 Bagauda lucifigus (Hemiptera: Reduviidae)
 Reduvius gua (Hemiptera: Reduviidae)
 Fulvinus brevicornis (Hemiptera: Miridae)
 Apanteles carpatus (Hymenoptera: Braconidae)
 Apanteles sp. (Hymenoptera: Braconidae)
 Aulosaphes sp. (Hymenoptera: Braconidae)
 Epitranus lacteipennis (Hymenoptera: Chalcididae)
 Epitranus stantoni (Hymenoptera: Chalcididae)
 Bathroponera rufipes (Hymenoptera: Formicidae)
 Bathroponera tridentata (Hymenoptera: Formicidae)
 Camponotus sp. (Hymenoptera: Formicidae)
 Leptogenys diminuta (Hymenoptera: Formicidae)
 Monomorium pharaonis (Hymenoptera: Formicidae)
 Paratrechina longicornis (Hymenoptera: Formicidae)
 Pheidole javana (Hymenoptera: Formicidae)
 Ponera sp. (Hymenoptera: Formicidae)
 Pristomyrmex sp. (Hymenoptera: Formicidae)
 Tapinoma melanocephalum (Hymenoptera: Formicidae)
 Hypsicerca cavicola (Hymenoptera: Ichneumonidae)
 Hypsicerca fullawayi (Hymenoptera: Ichneumonidae)
 Trogaspidia sp. (Hymenoptera: Mutillidae)
 Opogona cerodelta (Lepidoptera: Lyonetidae)
 Attacus atlas (Lepidoptera: Saturniidae)
 Tinea antricola (Lepidoptera: Tineidae)
 Tinea palaechrysis (Lepidoptera: Tineidae)
 Neglurus vitripennis (Neuroptera: Myrmeleontidae)
 Diestrammena gravely (Orthoptera: Gryllacridae)
 Gryllotalpa fulvipes (Orthoptera: Gryllotalpidae)
 Mermecophilus dubius (Orthoptera: Gryllidae)
 Pycnoscelus striatus (Orthoptera: Blattidae)
 Liposcelis sp. (Psocoptera: Liposcelidae)
 Parasoa haploneura (Psocoptera: Lepidopsocidae)
 Psyllipsocus batuensis (Psocoptera: Psyllipsocidae)
 Ectopsocus maindroni (Psocoptera: Peripsocidae)
 Parasoa haploneura (Psocoptera: Forficulidae)
 Thaumapsylla breviceps orientalis (Siphonaptera: Ischnopsyllidae)
 Parabathynella malaya (Bathynellacea: Bathynellidae)
 Armadillo intermixtus (Isopoda: Armadillidiidae)
 Philoscia dobakholi (Isopoda: Oniscidae)
 Unidentified (Podocopida: Cyprididae)
 Chaerilus prob. celebensis (Scorpionida: Chactidae)
 Bufo asper (Anura: Bufonidae)
 Bufo melanostictus (Anura: Bufonidae)
 Callula pulchra (Anura: Microhylidae)
 Rana calconota (Squamata: Scincidae)
 Collocalia sp. (Apodiformes: Apodidae)
 Hirundo daurica (Passeriformes: Hirundinidae)
 Myophoneus flavirostris (Passeriformes: Turdidae)
 Taphozous melanopogon (Chiroptera: Emballonuridae)
 Eonycteris spelaea (Chiroptera: Pteropodidae)
 Hipposideros armiger debilis (Chiroptera: Rhinolophidae)
 Hipposideros bicolor (Chiroptera: Rhinolophidae)
 Hipposideros diadema vicarius (Chiroptera: Rhinolophidae)
 Hipposideros galiterus (Chiroptera: Rhinolophidae)
 Rhinolophus affinis superans (Chiroptera: Rhinolophidae)
 Rhinolophus luctus morio (Chiroptera: Rhinolophidae)
 Myotis mystacinus (Chiroptera: Vespertilionidae)
 Rattus rattus jalorensis (Rodentia: Muridae)
 Crocidura malayana (Soricomorpha: Soricidae)
 Elaphe taeniura (Squamata: Colubridae)
 Dryophiops rubescens (Squamata: Colubridae)
 Ahaetulla formosa (Squamata: Colubridae)
 Gecko marmorata (Squamata: Gekkonidae)
 Lygosoma scotophilum (Squamata: Scincidae)
 Paludomus buccula, Paludomus buccula var. minuta (Thiaridae)
 Opeas doveri (Stylommatophora: Stenogyridae)
 Opeas dimorpha (Stylommatophora: Stenogyridae)
 Achatina fulica (Pulmonata: Achatinidae)
 Dugesia sp. (Seriata: Scincidae)

References

 McClure, E.H., B.L. Lim and S.E. Winn. 1967. Fauna of Dark Cave, Batu Caves, Kuala Lumpur, Malaysia. Pacific Insects 9(3): 399-428.

Other references:
 Abraham, H.C. 1923. A new spider of the genus Liphistius. Journal of the Malayan Branch of the Royal Asiatic Society 1: 13-21.
 Annandale, N. and F.H. Gravely. 1914. The limestone caves of Burma and the Malay Peninsula, Part II: The fauna of the caves. Journal and Proceedings of the Asiatic Society of Bengal (ns) 9(10) for 1913: 402-423.
 Bristowe, W.S. 1933. The liphistiid spiders (chapters I-VIII, X). In Bristowe, W.S. and J. Millot, The liphistiid spiders, with an appendix on their internal anatomy. Proceedings of the Zoological Society of London 1932: 1016-1045, 1055-1057.
 Bristowe, W.S. 1952. The arachnid fauna of the Batu Caves in Malaya. Annals and Magazine of Natural History (ser. 12) 5: 697-707.
 Bullock, J.A. 1971. Fauna of Gua Anak Takun. Malayan Nature Journal 24: 95-97.
 Bullock, J.A. 1972. Cave Biology in Malaysia. Malayan Nature Journal 25: 135-141.
 Buxton, B.H. 1924. Notes on the internal anatomy of Liphistius batuensis Abr.  Journal of the Malayan Branch of the Royal Asiatic Society 2(1): 85-86.
 Dittmar, K., M.L. Porter, L. Price, G. Svenson and M.F. Whitling. 2005. A Brief Survey of Invertebrates in Caves of Peninsular Malaysia. Malayan Nature Journal 57(2): 221-233.
 Dover, C. (ed.). 1929. Fauna of the Batu Caves, Selangor. Journal of the Federated Malay States Museums 14: 325-87.
 Dunn, F.L. 1965. Gua Anak Takun: Ecological Observations. Malayan Nature Journal 19(1): 75-87.
 Fage, L. 1929. Fauna of the Batu Caves, Selangor: x. Arachnida: Pedipalpi (Part) and Araneae. Journal of the Federated Malay States Museums 14: 356-64.
 Haupt, J. 2003. The Mesothelae - a monograph of an exceptional group of spiders (Araneae: Mesothelae): (Morphology, behavior, ecology, taxonomy, distribution and phylogeny). Zoologica 154: 1-102. 
 Heynes-Wood, M. and C. Dover. 1929. Fauna of the Batu Caves, Selangor: iii. Topography. Journal of the Federated Malay States Museums 14: 329.
 Klingel, H. 1966. Beobachtungen an Lipistius batuensis Abr. (Araneae, Mesothelae). Zoologischer Anzeiger Supplementband 30: 246-253.
 Lim, T.T. 2006. A Visit to Gua Anak Takun. Pencinta Alam 2006(12): 14.
 Lim, T.W. and S.S. Yussof. 2009. Conservation status of Batu Caves Trapdoor Spider (Liphistius batuensis Abraham (Araneae, Mesothelae)): A preliminary survey. Malayan Nature Journal 61: 121-132.
 McClure, E.H. 1965. Microcosms of Batu Caves and a List of Species Collected at Batu Caves. Malayan Nature Journal 19(1): 68.
 McClure, E.H. 1995. Stories I like to Tell: An Autobiography. Elliot McClure [published by the author], Camarillo, CA. p. 197.
 Murphy, F. and J. Murphy. 2000. An Introduction to the Spiders of South East Asia. Kuala Lumpur: Malaysian Nature Society.
 Platnick, N.I. 2008.  The World Spider Catalog, Version 9.0.  American Museum of Natural History <research.amnh.org>.
 Platnick, N.I. and W.C. Sedgwick. 1984. A Revision of the Spider Genus Liphistius (Araneae, Mesothelae). American Museum Novitates 2781: 1-31.
 Platnick, N.I. and W.J. Gertsch. 1976. The suborders of spiders: A cladistic analysis. American Museum Novitates 2607: 1-15.
 Price, L. 1996.  The discovery of an ancient cave. Pencinta Alam 1996(4): 3.
 Ridley, H.N. 1899. Caves in the Malay Peninsula: Appendix. Report of the British Association for the Advancement of Science 1898: 580.
 Roewer, C.Fr. 1962. Einige arachniden aus den Batu-Caves in Malaya. Pacific Insects 4(2): 517-520. 
 Schiödte, J.C. 1849. Om en afvigende Slaegt af Spindlernes Orden. Naturhistorisk Tidsskrift 2: 617-624.
 Soepadmo, E. and Ho Thian Hua. 1971. A Guide to Batu Caves. Kuala Lumpur: Malaysian Nature Society and Batu Caves Protection Association. p. 17.
 Yong, H.S. 1960. Field Biology: (d) Fauna of the Dark Cave (Batu Caves). Scientific Victorian 1960: 42-46.
 Yong, H.S. 1978. Living fossil spiders. Nature Malaysiana 3: 32-39.
 Yong, H.S. 1998. Spiders. The Encyclopedia of Malaysia 3: 94-95. Singapore: Archipelago Press.
 Yussof, S. 1985. The caves of Bukit Anak Takun. Nature Malaysiana 10(4): 4-9.
 Yussof, S. 1987. Gua Anak Takun Revisited. Malayan Naturalist 40(3&4): 12-16.
 Yussof, S. 1997.  The natural and other histories of Batu Caves.  Kuala Lumpur: Malaysian Nature Society.

 
Nature conservation in Malaysia
Cave animals